F. L. Schlagle High School is a fully accredited, public high school located in Kansas City, Kansas, United States. It serves students in grades 9 to 12 and is operated by the Kansas City USD 500 school district. The principal is Yolanda Thompson. The mascot is the Stallion and the school colors are blue, white, and gold.

History
In September 1973, F. L. Schlagle High School opened. The school was named after Frank Leslie Schlagle, the former superintendent of schools of the Kansas City, Kansas School District (1932–1962). Opening of the school was accompanied by a major shift in attendance zones between the old Washington district and the old USD #500.  The Schlagle zone was carved from the Washington and Wyandotte areas, but in addition, a major part of the Wyandotte zone lying generally north of Quindaro Boulevard and east as far as 12th Street was attached to the Washington zone.  The effect of those changes was to increase significantly the numbers and proportions of Black students at Washington, to reduce the Black enrollment at Wyandotte and to establish an integrated student body at Schlagle.  The opening of F. L. Schlagle coincided with the opening of J. C. Harmon High School

Sports and activities
F. L. Schlagle is a part of Kansas 5A classification. The school offers many sports and activities, including: Volleyball, Girls Basketball, Boys Basketball, Football, Wrestling, Baseball, Softball, Girls Soccer, Boys Soccer, Bowling, Track and Field, Cross Country, Scholar's Bowl, Forensics, Debate, Robotics, Choral Music, and a Skateboarding Team.

Team State Championships
Schlagle High School has won two Kansas State High School State Championships which were both in 5A boys basketball in 1993 and 1995.

Individual State Championship Records
 Deborah Crawford holds the Kansas State High School 4A girls High Jump record of 5'6" set in 1977.

Marching band
The F. L. Schlagle Marching Stallions utilize a high-step southern style marching.

The Marching Stallions have traveled and performed at many different locations and events including a yearly performance at the Big 12 men's basketball tournament at the T-Mobile Center in Kansas City, Missouri.

Notable alumni
Jennifer Jo Cobb, race car driver and team owner
Stephanie D. Davis, U. S. District court judge and U. S. Court of Appeals judge
Maurice Greene, Gold-medal winning U.S. Olympic track and field sprinter
Janelle Monáe, Grammy-nominated singer and actress best known for Hidden Figures and Moonlight 
Damian Rolls, former MLB player and former hitting coach of the Kansas City T-Bones
Sam Simmons, former NFL player

See also
 List of high schools in Kansas
 List of unified school districts in Kansas
Other high schools in Kansas City USD 500 school district
 J. C. Harmon High School in Kansas City
 Washington High School in Kansas City
 Wyandotte High School in Kansas City
 Sumner Academy of Arts and Science in Kansas City

References

External links
 F.L. Schlagle H.S.

Public high schools in Kansas
Buildings and structures in Kansas City, Kansas
Schools in Wyandotte County, Kansas
Education in Kansas City, Kansas
1973 establishments in Kansas